Joshi Hospital is a large state-run hospital in Pune, India. The hospital was founded in 1950 by Dr. L. B. Joshi, a surgeon in Pune. In 1978, he donated the hospital to Maharashtra Medical Foundation and since then, the foundation has operated the facility.

The hospital offers many modern facilities under one roof including general, laparoscopic, Oncological, hand, gastroenterology surgery. The hospital has more than 100 beds.

References

Hospitals in Pune
Hospital buildings completed in 1950
1950 establishments in Bombay State
20th-century architecture in India